Thijmen Blokzijl (born 25 February 2005) is a Dutch football player. He plays as a centre-back for Eredivisie club Groningen.

Club career
Blokzijl joined the youth teams of Groningen at the age of 11 and was first called up to the senior squad in May 2021.

Blokzijl made his Eredivisie debut for Groningen on 8 January 2023 in a game against Excelsior.

International career
He represented Netherlands at the 2022 UEFA European Under-17 Championship, where they were the runners-up.

References

External links
 

2005 births
Living people
Dutch footballers
Netherlands youth international footballers
Association football defenders
FC Groningen players
Eredivisie players